The 2012 World Snowboard Championships (WSC) took place in Oslo, Norway from February 10–19, 2012. 240 riders from approximately 35 countries competed in slopestyle and halfpipe disciplines.

The 2012 World Snowboarding Championships is the first championships run by snowboarders since 1999. It is developed and owned by the Ticket To Ride (TTR) and World Snowboard Federation (WSF). It is organized by Snowboard-VM 2012 AS – the local organizing company owned by The Arctic Challenge, The Norwegian Snowboard Federation and Oslo Vinterpark. The WSC got a full backing by the global snowboard community as expressed by the unanimous vote at the TTR and WSF general assemblies in Barcelona, May 2010.

Results

Medal count

Men

Men's Slopestyle results

Men's Halfpipe results

Women

Women's Slopestyle results

Women's Halfpipe results

External links
 www.wsc2012.com

World Championships, 2012
World Championships